Koyie Dolan Hill (pronounced 'Koy') (born March 9, 1979) is an American former professional baseball catcher. He played in Major League Baseball (MLB) for the Los Angeles Dodgers, Arizona Diamondbacks, Chicago Cubs, Miami Marlins, and Philadelphia Phillies. Hill resumed his playing career when he signed with the Kansas Stars in 2016.

Baseball career
While attending Wichita State University, Hill compiled a .355 batting average and 186 RBI primarily as a third baseman.

In , Hill played as the second baseman for Team USA. In the games, he totaled a .284 batting average, 3 home runs, and 21 RBI.

Los Angeles Dodgers
However, at the time, all-star catcher Paul Lo Duca was cemented as the Dodgers catcher, making Hill expendable. On July 31, Hill was one of the most prominent names in a trade, going from the Dodgers to the Arizona Diamondbacks for veteran Steve Finley. He would go on to hit .250 with 1 home run and 6 RBI in 2004 before breaking his ankle in a collision at home plate.

Arizona Diamondbacks
In , Hill began the season as the starting catcher for the Diamondbacks. His offense, however, did not perform at the level expected, as he would spend the majority of the year platooning with backup catcher Chris Snyder. Hill played in only 34 games in 2005, and many in the MLB community felt as though Diamondbacks manager Bob Melvin did not give Hill ample time to develop.

Koyie entered the Diamondbacks  spring training locked in a battle with Snyder for the backup role to Johnny Estrada, a major off-season acquisition of the Diamondbacks. Although Hill compiled an impressive spring camp (15-30 for a .500 batting average), on April 2, Hill was designated for assignment.

New York Yankees
On April 6, the Yankees picked him up on waivers, only to designate him for assignment on April 14, 2006. On April 17, he accepted an assignment to the Yankees' Triple-A team, the Columbus Clippers. Once the 2006 season concluded, Hill was released from the Yankees organization.

Chicago Cubs
On November 16, 2006, Hill signed a minor league contract with the Chicago Cubs.

On June 1, Hill was called up to replace the injured Henry Blanco. Hill saw action later that day as he was put into the game in the top of the sixth inning after Michael Barrett was taken out of the game after Barrett scuffled with teammate Carlos Zambrano.

On August 20, 2007, Hill was designated for assignment. The Cubs signed Hill to a minor league contract in the 2007 off-season so he could compete with Henry Blanco for the backup catcher role in spring training.

On September 1, Hill's contract was purchased by the Chicago Cubs and he was called up to the expanded 40-man roster.

On March 30, the Cubs released veteran backstop Paul Bako, making Hill the Cubs' backup catcher. Following an injury to Geovany Soto on July 7, Hill became the Cubs' starting catcher; as of August 1, he had caught all but two-thirds of an inning of the Cubs' 21 games during that period.

On December 12, 2011, Hill was non-tendered and became a free agent, possibly because of other backups to Soto within their farm system.

St. Louis Cardinals
On January 10, 2012, Hill signed a minor league deal with the St. Louis Cardinals that included an invitation to Spring Training. He was released on March 25.

Cincinnati Reds
On April 29, 2012, he signed a minor league contract with the Cincinnati Reds and was assigned to their Double-A affiliate, the Pensacola Blue Wahoos.

Second Stint with Cubs
Hill was hitting .195 in 14 games with Pensacola when, on May 19, he was reacquired by the Cubs. This happened after 3 of their catchers, Steve Clevenger, Geovany Soto and Welington Castillo, all went down with injuries in a span of 24 days.

On June 17, 2012, Hill did not accept being outrighted to Triple-A Iowa, and became a free agent.

Washington Nationals
On June 19, 2012, he signed a minor league contract with the Washington Nationals.

Texas Rangers
He was released on August 12, 2012, and signed a minor league contract with the Texas Rangers on August 14, 2012. He was subsequently released by the Texas Rangers on September 4, 2012.

Miami Marlins
On March 24, 2013, Hill signed a minor league contract with the Miami Marlins. He was outrighted off the roster on October 7, 2013 and elected to become a free agent.

Second Stint with Nationals
Hill signed a minor league contract with the Washington Nationals on February 4, 2014.

Philadelphia Phillies
On March 17, Hill was traded to the Philadelphia Phillies in exchange for a player to be named later or cash considerations. His contract was selected from the Lehigh Valley IronPigs on June 27. He was outrighted off the roster on July 21. He  elected  free agency, but re-signed with the Phillies in December 2014. The deal included an invite to major league spring training.

Table saw accident
On October 16, 2007, he was using a table saw to cut wood for a window frame. Part of the wood got caught in the saw, and the saw grabbed and his hand was in the way. The saw severed his thumb and severely cut into the other 4 fingers of his hand. His fingers were repaired, and after many months of therapy, he was able to regain motion in them.

Personal life
Koyie Hill and his wife, Meghan, have two daughters, Phoenix and Charley, who were born on September 27, 2004 and fall 2008.
Hill graduated from Eisenhower High School in Lawton, Oklahoma.

References

External links

1979 births
Living people
Sportspeople from Lawton, Oklahoma
Sportspeople from Tulsa, Oklahoma
Baseball players from Oklahoma
Major League Baseball catchers
Los Angeles Dodgers players
Arizona Diamondbacks players
Chicago Cubs players
Miami Marlins players
Philadelphia Phillies players
Wichita State Shockers baseball players
Yakima Bears players
Wilmington Waves players
Jacksonville Suns players
Las Vegas 51s players
Tucson Sidewinders players
Columbus Clippers players
Iowa Cubs players
Pensacola Blue Wahoos players
Syracuse Chiefs players
Round Rock Express players
New Orleans Zephyrs players
Lehigh Valley IronPigs players